Yakimanskaya Sloboda is a rural locality (a selo) in Murom Urban Okrug, Vladimir Oblast, Russia. The population was 1,486 as of 2010. There are 10 streets.

Geography 
Yakimanskaya Sloboda is located 3 km north of Murom. Mekhanizatorov is the nearest rural locality.

References 

Rural localities in Murom Urban Okrug